Vimukthi Kulatunga (born 14 November 1998) is a Sri Lankan cricketer. He made his Twenty20 debut on 10 January 2020, for Panadura Sports Club in the 2019–20 SLC Twenty20 Tournament. He made his List A debut on 26 March 2021, for Nugegoda Sports and Welfare Club in the 2020–21 Major Clubs Limited Over Tournament.

References

External links
 

1998 births
Living people
Sri Lankan cricketers
Nugegoda Sports and Welfare Club cricketers 
Panadura Sports Club cricketers
Place of birth missing (living people)